Valentine Esegragbo Melvine Strasser (born 26 April 1967) is an ex-military leader who served as head of state of Sierra Leone from 1992 to 1996. Previously a junior military officer he became the world's youngest Head of State in 1992, seizing power three days after his 25th birthday. He was the leading member in a group of six young Sierra Leonean soldiers who overthrew president Joseph Saidu Momoh in the 1992 Sierra Leonean coup d'état. They established a military junta called the National Provisional Ruling Council (NPRC).

In January 1996, after nearly four years in power, Strasser was ousted in a second military coup, led by his deputy, Brigadier General Julius Maada Bio.

Strasser is the first of only two Sierra Leonean Heads of State (the other is Julius Maada Bio) to be born after Sierra Leone became an Independent nation. He is also the second Sierra Leonean Head of State from the Krio ethnic group.

Strasser was born and raised in the neighbourhood of Allen Town in the east end of Sierra Leone's capital Freetown to Creole parents. He enlisted in the Republic of Sierra Leone Military Forces (RSLMF) at age eighteen, immediately after graduating from secondary school.

Early life
Valentine Esegragbo Melvin Strasser was born on 26 April 1967 in Freetown, the capital of Sierra Leone, to parents from the Creole ethnic group. At the time of Strasser's birth, Sir Albert Margai was the Prime Minister of Sierra Leone when the country was a parliamentary government. Strasser grew up in the neighbourhood of Allen Town, in the extreme East End of Freetown.

Strasser completed his secondary education at the Sierra Leone Grammar School in Freetown and graduated in 1985 at age eighteen. While in secondary school, Strasser was a gifted student in math and chemistry.

Military career
On graduation from secondary school in 1985, he enlisted in the Republic of Sierra Leone Military Forces (RSLMF) at the age of eighteen during the government of President Siaka Stevens, and was deployed for military training as a cadet officer at the Benguema Military Training Academy in Benguema, a town located just outside Freetown. After his training, he was commissioned into the Sierra Leone army at the young age of nineteen. He was posted to a military barracks in Daru, Kailahun District in Eastern Sierra Leone.

The Revolutionary United Front (RUF) led by Foday Sankoh began their first attack on 25 March 1991 in Buedu villages in Kailahun District. Strasser and other soldiers who were already in a military barracks in Kailahun, were sent to command and rout the rebellion against the RUF.

Before President Momoh was removed by his successor, Valentine Strasser fought against the Liberian invasion in Sierra Leone, particularly in the East and South of Sierra Leone. Strasser in his fight had to go up against domestic rebels, also known as sobels. President Momoh's presidency was not long-lasting because he denied the demands of the people of Sierra Leone at the time of his regime wanted a more cooperative political system and thought Momoh provided nothing different than his predecessor.”

1992 Coup and Head of State of Sierra Leone 
During Strasser's time at the war front in Kailahun District against the RUF, the Government of Sierra Leone led by president Joseph Saidu Momoh hardly supplied enough boots to the soldiers and the necessary military equipment to help fortify Strasser and his fellow soldiers in the war against the RUF. The soldiers never received their salaries on time and their welfare was hardly at the top of the government's list of priorities.

After many appeals, warnings or threats, the young soldiers decided to march down in their combat from Kailahun to the State House in Freetown on 29 April 1992, to protest about their setbacks in pursuing the war, demanding their outstanding salaries. The group of soldiers was led by Strasser himself and his two best friends and fellow soldiers Seargent Solomon Musa and Captain Sahr Sandy. The appearance of the soldiers in the capital city forced president Momoh to flee the country and he went into exile in Conakry, Guinea. This power vacuum motivated Strasser and his men to seize power, forming the NPRC, with Strasser as its leader and the Head of State of the country. Strasser became the youngest Head of State in the world at just twenty five years old.

1996 Coup
In January 1996, after nearly four years in power, Strasser was ousted in another military coup, but this time it was his own NPRC members who were not satisfied with his handling of the peace process. The coup was led by his deputy, Brigadier General Julius Maada Bio, along with Colonel Tom Nyuma and Captain Komba Mondeh. Bio quickly rose as the leader of the coup, with the support of Nyuma and Mondeh and took over as Head of State of Sierra Leone.

Post-Head of State
Following his overthrow, Strasser was given a fellowship by the UN to study law at the University of Warwick in Coventry, England, but stopped his studies after 18 months. In 2000, Strasser's application for asylum in England was rejected; he then left for the Gambia, only to be denied entry. He eventually returned to Sierra Leone, where he lived in poverty on a small pension in Grafton, east of Freetown, and worked at the ICT Institute providing computer skills for youths.
In January 2019, he fell gravely ill and was flown to Ghana for treatment. His left leg was partially amputated due to peripheral artery disease. After undergoing rehabilitation, he returned to Sierra Leone in July 2021, and received an apartment from President Bio. Amadu Makalo Koita, a member of the opposition All People's Congress, later alleged that the government was keeping Strasser under house arrest.

References

1967 births
Living people
People from Freetown
Sierra Leonean politicians
Leaders who took power by coup
Leaders ousted by a coup
Alumni of the University of Warwick
Sierra Leone Creole people
Sierra Leonean Christians
People of the Sierra Leone Civil War
Sierra Leonean military personnel
Sierra Leonean amputees